Karl (in Eifel dialect: Koahl) is an Ortsgemeinde – a municipality belonging to a Verbandsgemeinde, a kind of collective municipality – in the Bernkastel-Wittlich district in Rhineland-Palatinate, Germany.

Geography 

The municipality lies in the Eifel. The municipal area is 61.8% wooded. Lying some 9 km to the north is Manderscheid. Karl belongs to the Verbandsgemeinde Wittlich-Land.

History 
Beginning in 1794, Karl lay under French rule. In 1814 it was assigned to the Kingdom of Prussia at the Congress of Vienna. Since 1947, it has been part of the then newly founded state of Rhineland-Palatinate.

Politics

Municipal council 
The council is made up of 6 council members, who were elected by majority vote at the municipal election held on 7 June 2009, and the honorary mayor as chairman.

Coat of arms 
The municipality's arms might be described thus: Tierced in mantle, dexter argent a cross gules, sinister Or a bend of the second, and in base gules a wheel spoked of six of the first.

Culture and sightseeing 
In the middle of the village stands a lovely Bildstock. In the old chapel is found a Rococo column altar from the late 17th century.

Beyond the river Lieser, above the Karl Kaufmann Bridge and about halfway up the slope, are found a few remnants of the former Biederburg (castle).

Economy and infrastructure

Transport 
To the south runs the Autobahn A 60, and to the east, the A 1

References

External links 
 Verbandsgemeinde of Manderscheid 

Bernkastel-Wittlich